The State Assembly — Kurultai of the Republic of Bashkortostan is the regional parliament of Bashkortostan, a federal subject of Russia.  Its members are elected for five years.

The chairman is  since March 1999.

Overview
The jurisdiction of the State Assembly includes the adoption and amendment of the Bashkortostan Constitution, the definition of domestic and foreign policy Dealing with the change of borders, the definition of administrative and territorial structure, the approval of the state budget.

It succeeded the Supreme Soviet in 1995 and has two chambers: The House of Representatives and the Legislative House. The Chairman of the State Assembly presides over both chambers.

Elections

2018

References

See also
List of Chairmen of the State Assembly of Bashkortostan

Politics of Bashkortostan
Bashkortostan
Bashkortostan
1995 establishments in Russia